The 2013–14 Massachusetts Minutemen basketball team represented the University of Massachusetts Amherst during the 2013–14 NCAA Division I men's basketball season. The Minutemen, led by sixth year head coach Derek Kellogg, played their home games at the William D. Mullins Memorial Center and were members of the Atlantic 10 Conference.

Early in the season UMass won the Charleston Classic tournament.  Following this tournament victory and beginning the season 6–0, the Minutemen would be ranked #24 in the AP Poll.  This marked the first time since 1998 that UMass would be ranked in the AP Top 25. They finished the regular season 23–7, 10–6 in A-10 play to finish in a tie for fifth place. The Minutemen were eliminated in the A-10 tournament quarterfinals. They earned an at-large bid to the NCAA tournament, the school's first NCAA bid in 16 years. They lost in the second round of the NCAA Tournament to Tennessee to finish the season 24–9.

Shortly after the end of the season, sophomore starting guard Derrick Gordon came out as gay, making him the first Division I men's basketball player to do so while still playing in college.

Roster

Schedule

|-
!colspan=9 style="background:#881c1c; color:#FFFFFF;"| Exhibition

|-
!colspan=9 style="background:#881c1c; color:#FFFFFF;"| Regular season

|-
!colspan=9 style="background:#881c1c; color:#FFFFFF;"| Atlantic 10 tournament

|-
!colspan=9 style="background:#881c1c; color:#FFFFFF;"| NCAA tournament

Rankings

References

UMass Minutemen basketball seasons
UMass
UMass